Asghar Hossain Zaidi was a Member of the 4th National Assembly of Pakistan as a representative of East Pakistan.

Career
Zaidi was a Member of the  4th National Assembly of Pakistan representing Pabna-I. He was a Member of the Cabinet of President Ayub Khan. He and his family moved to Pakistan after the Independence of Bangladesh. His daughter, Cilocia Zaidi, is a journalist in Pakistan. His home in Pabna has been made a part of a law college there.

References

Pakistani MNAs 1965–1969
Living people
Year of birth missing (living people)